Konstantin Vladimirovich Belov (born 4 January 1990) is a Russian professional football player. He plays for Znamya Noginsk.

Club career
He made his Russian Football National League debut for FC Petrotrest Saint Petersburg on 23 July 2012 in a game against FC Yenisey Krasnoyarsk

References

External links
 
 
 

1990 births
Living people
Sportspeople from Ashgabat
Russian footballers
Association football defenders
Association football midfielders
Russian expatriate footballers
Expatriate footballers in Latvia
Expatriate footballers in Belarus
Expatriate footballers in Kyrgyzstan
Expatriate footballers in Georgia (country)
Expatriate footballers in Turkey
Russian expatriate sportspeople in Latvia
FC Amkar Perm players
FC Moscow players
FC Jūrmala players
FC Petrotrest players
FC Isloch Minsk Raion players
FC Alga Bishkek players
FC Khimki players
Latvian Higher League players
Belarusian Premier League players
Erovnuli Liga players